Laxman Karma   is an Indian politician. He was elected to the Lok Sabha, the lower house of the Parliament of India from Bastar,  Madhya Pradesh as a member of the Indian National Congress.

References

External links
 Official biographical sketch on the Parliament of India website

1944 births
Living people
Indian National Congress politicians
Lok Sabha members from Madhya Pradesh
India MPs 1980–1984